Sir Edward Barry, 1st Baronet FRS (1696 – 29 March 1776) was an Irish physician and politician.

Background and education
He was the son of Edward Barry and his wife Jane, and was educated at Trinity College, Dublin. In 1717, Barry graduated with a Bachelor of Arts. Subsequently, he studied at the University of Leyden in the Netherlands and became a Doctor of Medicine in 1721. He received the same degree by the University of Dublin in 1740 and the University of Oxford in 1761.

Career
Barry was elected a Fellow of the Royal Society in 1732. Additionally he was appointed a Fellow of the Royal College of Physicians of Ireland in 1740 and its president in 1749. Barry became Physician-General to the Army in Ireland in 1745. He taught as Regius Professor of Physic Dublin University between 1754 and 1761. A year later, Barry became a Fellow of the Royal College of Physicians of London and then a censor in 1763. He entered the Irish House of Commons in 1744, representing Charleville until 1760. On 1 August 1775, he was created a baronet, of the City of Dublin, in the Baronetage of Ireland.

Family
On 18 December 1746, Barry married secondly Jane Dopping, daughter of Anthony Dopping, sometime the Bishop of Ossory. He had four sons by his first wife and also three sons and two daughters by his second wife. Barry died at Bath, Somerset and was succeeded in the baronetcy by his eldest son Nathaniel. His third son Robert was also a Member of Parliament for Charleville.

References

1696 births
1776 deaths
Alumni of Trinity College Dublin
Baronets in the Baronetage of Ireland
Fellows of the Royal Society
Irish MPs 1727–1760
Leiden University alumni
Members of the Parliament of Ireland (pre-1801) for County Cork constituencies
Presidents of the Royal College of Physicians of Ireland